Pooth Khurd is a village in North West district in the Indian state of Delhi.It's basically a Jat(Dabas) village in the north-west region of Delhi . Pooth Khurd is great village among the other villages in outer Delhi.
Khurd and Kalan means small and Big respectively when two villages have same name then it is distinguished as Kalan means Big and Khurd means Small with Village Name. 

Cities and towns in North West Delhi district